Patrick Halpen or Halpin (fl. 1750–1790) was an Irish engraver.

Halpen worked in Dublin, and was principally engaged in engraving frontispieces and vignettes for booksellers there. He executed John Rocque's Survey of Dublin in Parishes, 1757, the geometrical elevation of the parliament house, 1767, and also engraved a portrait of Dr. Charles Lucas, after Thomas Hickey. He resided in Blackamoor Yard, and was for some years the only native line-engraver in Dublin.

References

Attribution

Year of birth missing
Year of death missing
Irish engravers
18th-century engravers